Chaglotovo is a rural locality (a village) in Noginskoye Rural Settlement, Syamzhensky District, Vologda Oblast, Russia. The population was 14 as of 2002.

Geography 
Chaglotovo is located 20 km north of Syamzha (the district's administrative centre) by road. Ivanovskaya is the nearest rural locality.

References 

Rural localities in Syamzhensky District